Ysgol y Creuddyn is a Welsh language secondary school, situated in Penrhyn Bay outside Llandudno, Wales, named after the Creuddyn peninsula.  The school was founded on Wednesday, the 2nd of September 1981 with 218 students, and is now home to approximately 600 students.  Students are bilingual, with all subjects taught in the Welsh language (apart from English and French lessons) up to GCSE level.

The school is the predominant Welsh language school in the area, and it serves pupils from a wide area including Abergele, Colwyn Bay, Betws yn Rhos, Conwy, Llandudno, Llanfairfechan, Penmaenmawr and Eglwysbach.  The school teaches children from the ages of 11 to 18, and is well known for students attaining successful grades at GCSE and A-level.

Notable former pupils
 Russell Jones, actor
 Al Lewis, singer-songwriter
 David Vaughan (footballer), Footballer

References

Secondary schools in Conwy County Borough
Welsh-language schools
Educational institutions established in 1981
Llandudno
1981 establishments in Wales